The Hansa Brandenburg W.27 and W.32 were prototype fighter floatplanes developed in parallel in Germany during World War I. They were developments of and intended replacements for the W.12 then in service and differed from each other principally in the choice of powerplant, the W.27 with a Benz Bz.IIIb and the W.32 with the same Mercedes D.III that the original W.12 used.

Development

Like the W.12, the W.27 and W.32 were single-bay biplanes of largely conventional configuration, unusual only in having no dorsal tail fin, with an all-moving rudder that projected below the fuselage and forward of the rudder post. They differed from the earlier design in having shorter fuselages, more severely staggered wings, and I-struts for both the interplane and cabane bracing, where the W.12 had used more conventional pairs of struts.

Neither prototype resulted in any production orders, and the true successor to the W.12 was to be a monoplane derivative, the W.29.

Variants
W.27 version powered by a Benz Bz.IIIb
W.32 version powered by a Mercedes D.III

Specifications (W.27)

References

1910s German fighter aircraft
Floatplanes
W.27
Single-engined tractor aircraft
Biplanes
Aircraft first flown in 1918